Louise-Renée Leduc (died 1793), known as Louise Reine Audu, was a French fruit seller, known for her participation in the French revolution. She was counted as one of the Heroines of the revolution.

On 5 October 1789 she, alongside Theroigne de Mericourt, led The Women's March on Versailles. At Versailles, she belonged to the delegation allowed an audience with the monarch to put forward their complaints. She led the march back to Paris with the royal court in triumph. Afterwards, however, she was imprisoned in Grand Châtelet and Conciergerie. She was freed 15 September 1791 by the efforts of the Cordeliers and Louis-Barthélemy Chenaux. On 10 August 1792, she participated in the storming of the Tuileries Palace. She fought personally with the soldiers of the Swiss guard. She was honoured with a sword by the Paris commune for her acts.

In a book published in 1802, author Pierre Joseph Alexis Roussel reported that Reine Audu's mental health had suffered during her stay in prison and that she "died insane in the hospital in 1793".

Sources 
 Marc de Villiers, Les 5 et 6 octobre 1789. Reine Audu les légendes des journées d'octobre, 1917.

References

People of the French Revolution
Year of birth missing
Year of death missing
18th-century French women
18th-century French businesspeople
Women in the French Revolution
1793 deaths